Winter 1960 is a 1983 Belgian drama film directed by Thierry Michel. It was entered into the 13th Moscow International Film Festival.

Cast
 Philippe Léotard as André
 Christian Barbier as Le père d'André
 Marcel Dossogne as Charles
 Paul Louka as Fred
 Ronny Coutteure as Albert
 Jenny Clève as Nelly - la mère d'André

References

External links
 

1983 films
1983 drama films
Belgian drama films
1980s French-language films
French-language Belgian films